This is a list of German television related events from 1958.

Events
20 January - Margot Hielscher is selected to represent Germany at the 1958 Eurovision Song Contest with her song "Für zwei Groschen Musik". She is selected to be the third German Eurovision entry during Schlager held at the Kleine Westfalenhalle in Dortmund.

Debuts

ARD
 10 January –   Sie schreiben mit (1958–1970)
 14 March –  Stahlnetz (1958–1968)
 13 September –  Nachsitzen für Erwachsene (1958–1966)

DFF
 12 November – Haare hoch! (1958– 1959)

Television shows

1950s
Tagesschau (1952–present)

Ending this year

Births
26 September - Sabrina Fox, TV host
24 October - Margit Geissler-Rothemund, actress

Deaths